The Birlya (Bärle), a tributary of the Sviyaga, is a river in the Republic of Tatarstan in Russia. The name has its origin from the Tatar language words bure and ile which mean "the river on the place of wolves" or Finno-Ugric languages word hop. There is information that Cheremisa people (Mari people) used to raise hop.

Geography
The Birlya begins south of a village Bolshoe Podberezye, 3 km away. It flows into the Sviyaga, north of the village Burunduki. As for hydrology, it is a low river. Flow distribution is irregular.

Practical use
This river is used by locals for daily living needs, as a drinking place of a nowt. It has been recognized as natural landmark since 10 January 1978.

References 

 Татарская энциклопедия: В 6 т /Гл. ред. М. Х. Хасанов, отв. ред. Г. С. Сабирзянов. — Казань: Институт Татарской энциклопедии АН РТ.
 

Rivers of Tatarstan